Joseph McCarthy (born October 7, 1972) is an American professional stock car racing driver. He is a former competitor in the NASCAR Cup Series, NASCAR Busch Series (now Xfinity), NASCAR Truck Series, NASCAR Busch East Series (now ARCA East), and the NASCAR Winston Modified Tour (now the Whelen Modified Tour). He is also the 1987 New Jersey state champion in kart racing.

Racing career
Starting his racing career at age 10, McCarthy made a name for himself in kart racing, winning the 1987 New Jersey State Karting Championship. He moved to stock car competition in 1991, competing at Flemington Speedway, where he won the track's rookie championship.

McCarthy made his debut in NASCAR touring series competition in 1994, competing in the Featherlite Modified Tour; he ran two events in the series with a best finish of 24th. In 1995 McCarthy moved to NASCAR's national touring series, making his first attempt to qualify in the Busch Series; he attempted two races but failed to qualify for either. He qualified for his first Busch Series race in 1996, competing at Nazareth Speedway and finishing 34th; McCarthy would make seven additional starts in the series over the next two years, with a best finish of 28th at Nazareth in 1997.

McCarthy began his career in the Busch North Series, a New England-based regional series running cars similar to those in the Busch Grand National series, in 1998; he became a regular on the season schedule in 2001, running for Rookie of the Year honors that year and finishing second in the rookie points standings. McCarthy scored his first and only win with J.T. Mase Motorsports with Jason Weissman as Crew Chief in the Busch North Series in 2003, at Holland International Speedway in Holland, New York. He also returned to the Whelen Modified Tour in 2003, competing at New Hampshire International Speedway and finishing 41st.

McCarthy competed in the Toyota All-Star Showdown between 2003 and 2006, representing the Busch North Series; he won a qualifying race for the 2003 event, finishing seventh in the main event; in 2004 he placed third in the Showdown's feature race.

In 2005, in addition to continuing to compete as a regular in the Busch North Series, McCarthy attempted to move up to the NASCAR Craftsman Truck Series; he attempted to qualify for the Kroger 250 at Martinsville Speedway, but failed to post a speed sufficient to qualify for the event. He also signed with Mach One Motorsports to drive the No. 34 Chevrolet on a limited schedule in the Nextel Cup Series; following several races for which he failed to qualify, McCarthy made the field for his first and only Cup race at New Hampshire Motor Speedway in the Sylvania 300, driving the No. 92 TrimSpa Dodge for Front Row Motorsports and finishing 31st in the event.

McCarthy returned to the Busch Series in 2006 for a single event, competing in the New England 200 at New Hampshire for Keith Coleman Racing and finishing 43rd; he failed to qualify for the weekend's Nextel Cup Series event, driving the No. 34 Chevrolet for Front Row Motorsports in his final attempt to race in NASCAR's top series. McCarthy tied his best career points finish in the renamed Busch East Series that year, finishing 6th in points; it would be his final season in the series.

In 2007, McCarthy could not find a ride in NASCAR as a driver and became a pit crew member for numerous teams in the following years. He was last known to be working for JTG Daugherty Racing in the Cup Series in 2011 as a crew member for their No. 47 car, at the time driven by Bobby Labonte.

Motorsports career results

NASCAR
(key) (Bold – Pole position awarded by qualifying time. Italics – Pole position earned by points standings or practice time. * – Most laps led.)

Nextel Cup Series

Busch Series

Craftsman Truck Series

Busch East Series

Winston Modified Tour

References

External links
 
 Joey McCarthy at Driver Database

Living people
1972 births
People from Mendham Township, New Jersey
Racing drivers from New Jersey
Sportspeople from Morris County, New Jersey
NASCAR drivers